...If I Ever Fall in Love is the debut album of American R&B group Shai, released December 22, 1992, on MCA Records. It was produced by group members Carl "Groove" Martin and Darnell Van Rensalier.

The album produced three hit singles, "If I Ever Fall in Love", "Comforter", and "Baby I'm Yours". On January 13, 1994, ...If I Ever Fall in Love was certified double platinum by the Recording Industry Association of America (RIAA), for shipments of two million copies in the United States. Although it performed well commercially, the album received generally mixed reviews from music critics.

Reception 
Rolling Stone gave the album three-and-a-half out of five stars and complimented its "crisp, precise harmonies that imply explosive vocal power but display few pyrotechnics", adding that "Shai joins the spiritual yearnings of Take Six with the secular pull of Boyz II Men". David Browne of Entertainment Weekly found its hip hop and new jack swing-oriented songs "fussy [and] unconvincing", but praised the group's crooning and stated, "They wrap their voices like a thick shag carpet around the choruses of the album's languorous, starry-eyed ballads".

However, in his consumer guide for The Village Voice, critic Robert Christgau gave the album a B− rating and named it "dud of the month", indicating "a bad record whose details rarely merit further thought". Christgau found the group's singing "indifferent" and panned them as having "no class and no sense of humor; they're too smarmy and too slow", adding that "They epitomize the difference between seduction and betrayal--between shared lie and imposed illusion, rascal and bounder, rogue and complete asshole. There's not a winning wink on the entire album". In a retrospective review, Allmusic editor Stephen Thomas Erlewine gave it two-and-a-half out of five stars and stated, "Apart from the gorgeous title track, most of the material on ...If I Ever Fall in Love is underdeveloped; although Shai sound terrific, their material doesn't match their vocal talents".

Track listing

Personnel 
 Bill Appleberry – keyboards
 Paul Brown – engineer, mixing
 Jeff Carruthers – programming
 Mario Castellanos – photography
 Jim Ebert – mixing
 James Elliott – production coordination
 Marc Gay – keyboards, producer
 Eric Greedy – assistant engineer
 Steve Hall – mastering
 Kevin Levi – saxophone
 Carl "Groove" Martin – keyboards, producer, programming
 Ken Schubert – engineer
 Darnell VanRensalier – drum programming, keyboards, producer
 Cyndra Williams – make-up

Charts

Certifications

References

External links
 ...If I Ever Fall in Love at Discogs

1992 debut albums
Shai (band) albums
MCA Records albums